Trust Bank Limited (Gambia), commonly known as Trust Bank Ltd (TBL), but also referred to as Trust Bank (Gambia), is a private commercial bank in the Gambia. It is one of the fourteen commercial banks licensed by the Central Bank of the Gambia, the national banking regulator.

History
Trust Bank Limited was founded in 1997 by private investors, with the objective of offering banking services to local and International individuals and businesses in a timely, professional, courteous manner, in a profitable framework. At its inception, Trust Bank acquired the assets and liabilities of the defunct Meridian Biao (Gambia) Bank. 

In 2002, the shares of stock of Trust Bank Gambia Limited were listed on the Ghana Stock Exchange (GHA), where they trade under the symbol: TBL.

Overview
Trust bank is a medium-sized financial services provider in the Gambia. , the bank's total asset valuation was about US$121.4 million (GMD:4.75 billion), with shareholders' equity in excess of US$11.3 million (GMD:440.2 million). The bank is one of the largest commercial banks in the Gambia, both by asset size and by branch network.

Ownership
The bank has over 1,000 shareholders with the largest shareholder being the Social Security and Housing Finance Corporation, (SSHFC) of the Gambia.

Branch network
, the bank maintains branches at the following locations:

 Head Office - 34 Ecowas Avenue, Banjul
 Bakau Branch - Sait Matty Road, Bakau
 Airport Branch - Banjul International Airport, Yundum
 Bakoteh Branch - Tipper Garage, Bakoteh
 Basse Santa-Su Branch - Upper River Division, Basse Santa Su
 Brikama Branch - Western Region, Brikama
 Farafenni Branch - North Bank Region, Farafenni
 Kaloli/Senegambia Branch - Wilmon Company Building, Bertil Harding Highway, Kololi
 Latrikunda Branch - Sabiji, Serrekunda
 Serrekunda Branch 2 - Sayerr Jobe Avenue, Saho Kunda, Serrekunda
 Serrekunda Branch 3 - Westfield Junction, Serrekunda
 Soma Branch - Lower River Region, Soma

See also
List of banks in the Gambia
Central Bank of the Gambia

References

Companies listed on the Ghana Stock Exchange
Banks of the Gambia
Banks established in 1997
Banjul